The United States federal budget for fiscal year 1992 ran from October 1, 1991, to September 30, 1992.

Revenue
Receipts by source: (in billions of dollars)

Outlays
The total outlays for fiscal year 1992 was 1.4 trillion dollars.
The budget deficit was $290.3 billion, 4.5% of GDP

References

1992
1992 in American politics
United States federal budget